Charles R. McCormick Lumber Company was founded in 1908 by Charles R. McCormick in San Francisco, California. McCormick purchased a mill site in St. Helens, and formed the Helens Mill Company. To feed the mill McCormick's St. Helens Timber Company also purchased 4,000 acres of timber. In 1912 McCormick formed the St. Helens Lumber Company as parent company over Helens Mill Company and the St. Helens Timber Company. In 1912 McCormick expanded the company with a second sawmill, a creosoting plant and shipyard, the St. Helens shipyard.  McCormick also expanded into San Diego, California with a railroad ties factory, to supply Santa Fe Railway and the mines of Utah, Arizona, New Mexico, and northern Mexico. At the San Diego site, he built a dock to unload his timbers. With the Great Depression slow down, McCormick closed dock at San Diego in April 1931.

In 1925 McCormick expanded again, buying the Puget Mill Company from Pope & Talbot, Inc.  He had trouble raising the money to buy the company for cash, but the motivated sellers decided to finance the sale, taking mortgages on everything McCormick owned as security. The deal included almost nothing as a down payment, but stipulated that the money Mr. McCormick HAD been able to raise toward the purchase must be spent on upgrading the existing facilities. The sale closed on October 16, 1925.  Mr. McCormick had no trouble spending money on the upgrades. In fact, it is said that he just told his people to "buy the best" and left them to their devices. Very quickly the budget was overspent, often on equipment that wasn't necessarily needed—including top-tier logging equipment  and a fleet of new locomotives. Puget Mill had previously purchased on option on the southern branch of the Port Townsend & Southern Railroad, including the line between Port Discovery and Quilcene, Washington.  McCormick closed the sale, and use the line to feed timber from company lands in the Quilcene River and Snow Creek valleys to the mills at Port Gamble and Port Ludlow. (Logs were hauled a log dumps at Linger Longer Bay near Quilcene, dumped into the Hood Canal, and towed to the sawmills.  This operation was managed out of Camp Talbot, located beside Crocker Lake, south of Port Discovery. He also built new sawmills, in 1926 one at Port Gamble, Washington and one at Port Ludlow. The Port Ludlow logging operations were based at Camp Walker, at the head of Ludlow Bay. McCormick purchased West Fork Logging Company, with timberlands and a logging railroad based at Camp Union, near Seabeck, Washington. McCormick also acquired a logging railroad and timberland near Castle Rock, Washington, which operated out of Camp Cowlitz.

Because of his overspending on upgrades and other properties (as well as fluctuations in the lumber market) McCormick struggled to keep the operations afloat, particularly struggling to make his payments to the Pope and Talbot principals.  The Pope & Talbot team intervened, taking partial control of the McCormick company.  McCormick resorted to harvesting the timber on his land at unsustainable rates, trying to try to increase the company's cashflow enough to cover the annual payments to the Pope and Talbot principals.  He soon ran low on timber, and when he wasn't able to do any more, in 1938 the Pope and Talbot families foreclosed on the mortgages, forcing McCormick into bankruptcy. The P&T families bought the rest of McCormick's assets from the bankruptcy sale, reorganized the company as Pope & Talbot, and quickly resumed operations.

Over expanded and hit by the Depression, McCormick had to give the Puget Mill Company mill back, also his other companies, and properties to Pope & Talbot.

St. Helens shipyard
Between 1912 and 1927 the St. Helens shipyard, the St. Helens Shipbuilding Company in St. Helens, Oregon on Sauvie Island just south of Warrior Point, launched 42 wooden ships. The St. Helens shipyard also did repair work at the shipyard. St. Helens Shipbuilding Company built ships for the Emergency Fleet Corporation to support World War I

Partial list of ships built:
SS Wapama, steam schooner in 1915
Celilo in 1913, wooden steam schooner

McCormick Steamship Company
The McCormick Steamship Company, McCormick  Lines, was organized in 1921, and by 1925 this corporation had 71 ships operating between 23 ports on the Pacific Coast. The ships had lumber cargo and Passenger Service. Became a part of the Pope & Talbot line in 1938.

 Wapama 1915 steam schooner
 Forbes Hauptmann, built in 1919 by Ames, was Western Ally, hit a mine and sank in 1944 
 Francis H. Leggett
 SS Charles R. McCormick, Built in 1920 by Standifer, of Vancouver WA

1919 Ports: San Diego, Los Angeles (San Pedro), San Francisco, Portland, Hoquiam, Aberdeen, and Seattle

McCormick Steamship Company Ships in 1919:
 Klamath
 Celilo
 Willamette
 Multnomah
 Wapama

Ships 1927, ports: Los Angeles, San Francisco, Portland
 Rose City
 Newport 	

In 1927 McCormick Steamship Company purchased the Pacific Argentine Brazil Line. Pacific Argentine Brazil Line Routes: Seattle, San Francisco, Los Angeles, Bahia Blanca, Montevideo, Buenos Aires, Buenos Aires, Santos, Bahia, and Puerto Colombia. President Hayes (1920) (was Creole State) and President Harrison (was Wolverine State), Design 1095 ships

1927 Ships:
 Edna
 Newport
 W.R. Chamberlin Jr.
 Wallingford
 Indiana Harbor
 Silverado
 Willamette
 Alvarado
 Wapama
 Sudbury
 Mystic
 Munsomo
 Chas. R. McCormick
 Munaires
 Ipswich

Ships 1940, ports: Seattle, Portland, San Francisco, Los Angeles, Balboa, Cristobal, Norfolk, Baltimore, Philadelphia, New York, San Juan
 Hollywood
 West Cactus
 West Camargo
 West Ira
 West Ivis
 West Mahwah
 West Nilus
 West Notus, sunk by U-404 May 1942

World War II
McCormick Steamship Company fleet of ships that were used to help the World War II effort. During World War II McCormick Steamship Company operated Merchant navy ships for the United States Shipping Board. During World War II McCormick Steamship Company was active with charter shipping with the Maritime Commission and War Shipping Administration. McCormick Steamship Company operated Liberty ships and Victory ships for the merchant navy. The ship was run by its McCormick Steamship Company crew and the US Navy supplied United States Navy Armed Guards to man the deck guns and radio.

World War II ships
Liberty ships operated:
 William Ellery
 F. Marion Crawford
 Elihu Yale, on Feb. 15, 1944 was it by glider bomb and exploded off Anzio, while unloading ammunition
 Elinor Wylie, on Oct. 6, 1944 hit mine off Southern France, was towed to Toulon
 Robert J. Walker, on Dec. 25, 1944 was torpedoed and sank by U-862 off Sydney
 Russell H. Chittenden, on March 13, 1945, ran ashore and wrecked off New Guinea
 James Russell Lowell on Oct. 15, 1943 was torpedoed and damaged by U-371 off Algeria, beached Philippeville
 James W. Marshall on Sept. 15, 1943 was damaged by guided bomb off Salerno, towed to UK later on June 8, 1944. Sunk as part of Gooseberry Harbor blockship off Normandy beachhead. Later destroyed by storms.
 James W. Nesmith on April 7, 1945, was torpedoed and damaged by U-1024 in Irish Sea, beached at Holyhead, towed to Liverpool but was a lose. June 3, 1946 was towed to Bremerhaven, loaded with cargo of obsolete ammunition, towed to sea and scuttled
 Lydia M. Child, on April 27, 1943, was torpedoed and sunk by Japanese submarine I-178 off Australia
 Fitz-John Porter, on March 1, 1943, was torpedoed and sunk by U-518 off Brazil

Victory ships operated:
 St. Cloud Victory
 Twin Falls Victory
 Warwick Victory
 Beloit Victory
 Maryville Victory
 Duke Victory
 Clark Victory
 Netherlands Victory
 Hope Victory
 Joplin Victory
 Lawrence Victory
 Linfield Victory
War loses:
Absaroka Dec. 24, 1941 torpedoed, but repaired 
West Ira June 20, 1942 torpedoed 
West Ivis Jan. 26, 1942 torpedoed 
West Notus June 1, 1942 shelled by submarine 
West Portal Feb. 5, 1943 torpedoed 
Elihu Yale Feb. 15, 1944 struck by aerial glider bomb 
Fitz John Porter March 1, 1943 torpedoed 
Starr King Feb. 10, 1943 torpedoed

See also 
 World War II United States Merchant Navy

References 

Defunct shipping companies of the United States
American companies established in 1908
St. Helens, Oregon